Olivenebula pulcherrima is a species of moth of the family Noctuidae. It is found in India (Darjeeling, Dharmsala).

References

Moths described in 1867
Hadeninae